Ronald Kenneth Zanussi (born August 31, 1956) is a Canadian former professional ice hockey right winger who played five seasons in the National Hockey League (NHL) for the Minnesota North Stars and Toronto Maple Leafs between 1977 and 1982.

Playing career
Zanussi was born in Toronto, Ontario, and played minor hockey for the West Hill Minor Hockey League team in the SHA (Scarborough Hockey Association).  As a youth, he played in the 1969 Quebec International Pee-Wee Hockey Tournament with a minor ice hockey team from Dorset Park. He later played with the London Knights of the OHA. He was selected in the third round, 51st overall, by the Minnesota North Stars in the 1976 NHL Amateur Draft and in the eighth round, 87th overall by the Cleveland Crusaders in the 1976 WHA Amateur Draft. He played his first pro year with the Fort Wayne Komets of the International Hockey League (IHL) in 1976–77, scoring 53 goals and was named the co-winner of the IHL's Rookie of the Year award. He joined the North Stars the following season, playing the majority of the next four years in Minnesota before moving onto the Maple Leafs for two. Zanussi retired in 1984 having played 299 NHL games and scoring 52 goals.

Career statistics

Regular season and playoffs

References

External links

1956 births
Living people
Canadian people of Italian descent
Canadian ice hockey right wingers
Cincinnati Tigers players
Cleveland Crusaders draft picks
Fort Wayne Komets players
Fort Worth Texans players
London Knights players
Minnesota North Stars draft picks
Minnesota North Stars players
Oklahoma City Stars players
St. Catharines Saints players
Sherbrooke Jets players
Ice hockey people from Toronto
Toronto Maple Leafs players